The discography of American singer Sam Tsui consists of five studio albums, three EPs and six singles.

Studio albums

Extended plays

Singles

Covers

References

Discographies of American artists
Pop music discographies